The Quetta Development Authority is an agency of the Government of Balochistan, Pakistan. The authority is responsible for providing municipal services to the city of Quetta. The Authority was established in 1978.

See also 
 Gwadar Development Authority
 Balochistan Development Authority

References

External links 
 Quetta Development Authority

Government agencies of Balochistan, Pakistan
Quetta
1978 establishments in Pakistan
Government agencies established in 1978